Sidi Yahya El Gharb is a town in Sidi Slimane Province, Rabat-Salé-Kénitra, Morocco. According to the 2004 census it has a population of 31,705.

Prior to June 2010 Sidi Yahya El Gharb was in Kénitra Province.

See also
United States Naval Communications Station Sidi Yahya El Gharb

References

Populated places in Sidi Slimane Province
Municipalities of Morocco